Eupithecia suspiciosata is a moth in the family Geometridae. It was described by Karl Dietze from the US state of California.

References

Moths described in 1875
suspiciosata
Moths of North America